Devapamil is a calcium channel blocker. It is also known as desmethoxyverapamil, which is a phenylalkylamine (PAA) derivative. Devapamil not only inhibits by blocking the calcium gated channels, but also by depolarizing the membrane during the sodium-potassium exchanges.

Structure 
Devapamil consists of two aromatic rings with methoxy substituents connected by an alkylamine chain increasing flexibility and overall potency.

Animal studies 
Devapamil in rats can be used to decrease glutathione levels and increase oxidation of lipids, which makes it effective in preclusion of ulcers caused by stress. The medical characteristics of this drug, and other phenylalkylamines, depends greatly on the state of the calcium channels being targeted which results in a greater affinity and drug efficiency.

References 

Calcium channel blockers
Catechol ethers
Nitriles
Isopropyl compounds
Phenethylamines